Olizarenko is a surname. Notable people with the surname include:

 Anatoly Olizarenko (born 1936), Soviet cyclist
 Nadiya Olizarenko (born 1953), Soviet-Ukrainian middle-distance runner, wife of Serhiy
 Serhiy Olizarenko (born 1954), Soviet-Ukrainian steeplechase runner